The Barakar River is the main tributary of the Damodar River in eastern India. The main tributaries, Barsoti and Usri, flow in from the south and north respectively. Apart from the two main tributaries some fifteen medium or small streams join it.

Floods

The river flows in all fury during the rains in its upper reaches and has washed away two bridges constructed successively on the Grand Trunk Road. The narrow iron bridge, which was built to replace it, withstood the strains of troop movement during the Second World War, but gave way in 1946, with another great flood. A new bridge built in the 1950s has withstood the fury of the river.

There is another bridge on the Grand Trunk Road, across the Barakar, connecting Barakar a neighbourhood in Asansol having the same name, in Bardhaman district of West Bengal with Chirkunda in Jharkhand. With heavy traffic in the heart of the coal belt, the bridge built in the mid-19th century is in need of repairs. A new bridge has been built, to the north, on the bypass running from Kalipahari in Asansol to Nirsa in Dhanbad district.

The huge volume of monsoon water was carried down the valley and formerly created havoc with floods in the lower Damodar basin. In order to harness the river (along with the Damodar), the Damodar Valley Corporation (DVC) planned and implemented independent India's first multipurpose river valley project. The first dam of the project was constructed across the Barakar at Tilayia.

Dams and power stations

Tilaiya

DVC's first dam, Tilaiya Dam, was across the Barakar at Tilaiya, in Hazaribagh district of Jharkhand, now in Koderma district of Jharkhand. It was inaugurated on 21 February 1953. Tilaiya hydel power station is located on the left bank of the river Barakar. The structure is entirely of reinforced concrete. It has two generating units of 2 MW each with a provision for a third future unit of the same capacity.

Maithon

DVC's second dam was across the Konar, a tributary of the Damodar, in Hazaribagh district, and the third was across the Barakar at Maithon in Dhanbad district of Bihar, now Jharkhand. The river forms the boundary between West Bengal and Jharkhand in that area. The dam was inaugurated on 27 September 1957. The unique feature of Maithon is that the hydel power station is located underground in the left bank of the river (on the West Bengal side) and is the first of its kind in India. The Power Station has a total generating capacity of 60 MW with three units of 20 MW each.

Other neighbourhood and suburbs in Asansol namely Rupnarainpur, Chittaranjan and Kulti-Barakar-Neamatpur-Dishergarh lie still nearer. It receives a steady and daily stream of tourists.

In order to augment the meagre hydroelectric power generation DVC has gone in for both gas turbine and thermal power generation. While most of its facilities for such generation lie in the Damodar region, Maithon in the Barakar regions is a major focal point. Maithon Gas Turbine Station was commissioned at Maithon in 1989. The station has an installed capacity of 82.5 MW with three units each of 27.5 MW capacity.

The 2 X 500 MW Maithon Right Bank thermal power station is under implementation. It is a joint venture of Tata Power and DVC. A 2 X 500 MW greenfield thermal power station has been proposed for Koderma.

Fisheries
The reservoirs at Tilaiya and Maithon, provided scope for development of fisheries. Efforts were made to introduce carp once the water accumulated behind the dams but the results have not been commensurate with the efforts.

See also

List of rivers of India

References

Rivers of Jharkhand
Rivers of West Bengal
Rivers of India